R. metallica may refer to:
 Rhagoletis metallica, a fruit fly species
 Rhytidoponera metallica, the green-head ant, green ant, or green-headed ant, or metallic pony ant, an ant species found throughout Australia

See also
 Metallica (disambiguation)